Tropical Storm Elida was a strong tropical storm that killed 6 people offshore Mexico and affected over 1,000 others. The ninth tropical cyclone of the below-average 1996 Pacific hurricane season, Elida's origins was a tropical wave that organized into Tropical Depression Eight-E on August 30. The cyclone paralleled the coast of Mexico and also gradually decelerated. Despite some wind shear, Eight-E strengthened into a tropical storm on September 2 and was named Elida. The cyclone then drifted into cooler waters, was devoid of deep convection on September 5, and dissipated the next day.

The storm was forecast slightly better than the long term averages for the eastern North Pacific. Elida posed enough of a threat to the Baja California Peninsula to require a tropical storm warning for the Baja California Peninsula south of Cabo San Lázaro on September 3. The warning was lifted on September 5 after the threat ended. While passing offshore, the tropical storm killed six people and affected 1,200 others, but the damages were minimal.

Meteorological history

A tropical wave moved across the tropical Atlantic during mid to late August, developing a small area of thunderstorms each day.  After it moved into the Pacific Ocean, thunderstorm activity became more concentrated on August 30 to the south of Mexico. The low soon had experienced deep convection in the system, which will lead to the storm's intensification.

Intensifying into a tropical depression, Elida initially was heading course west-northwest towards the 110th meridian at 12:00 UTC. Light northeasterly vertical wind shear kept Elida's development slow, but prominent wind bands and independent thunderstorms supported Elida's development further. with the system named Tropical Storm Elida on September 2. This new system was 175 miles (282 km) off the coast of Baja California. Elida posed enough of a threat to the Baja California Peninsula to require a tropical storm warning and some sources state hurricane watches for the Baja California Peninsula south of Cabo San Lázaro on September 3 at 21:00 UTC. Elida was 200 km west-southwest of the southern tip of the Baja California peninsula. and moving at 3 mph at the time.

Tropical storm force winds had extended outwards out to 85 miles (140 km) from the center.  The tropical storm warning for Elida was lifted on September 5 after the threat had ended.

An upper low moved to the north of the system, slowing its forward movement and shifting its track more northerly in the direction of Baja California.  After paralleling the southern tip of the peninsula, a combination of vertical wind shear and reduced sea surface temperatures weakened the system to dissipation by the time it passed Point Eugenia on September 7. Another factor to the dissipation was the surface circulation and the stripping of the system's deep convection.

Preparations and impact
During Elida's passage, the storm killed 6 people offshore and affected more than 1,200 people. Moderate to heavy rains fell in association with the tropical cyclone across southwest Mexico and the Baja California Peninsula.

Baja California Sur had also underwent a tropical storm warning that day. Socorro Island had been impacted by Elida as well.

Ports on the Baja California coast had to close down due to Elida's 7-foot waves.

While passing offshore, the tropical storm killed six people and affected 1,200 others, but the damages were minimal. Elida had tropical storm warnings until September 5 when Elida was degraded to a tropical depression. Elida dissipated after passing by Point Eugenia on September 7.

See also

 1997 Pacific hurricane season
 Hurricane Elida

References

1996 Pacific hurricane season